Podagatlapalli is a village in Ravulapalem mandal in East Godavari District of Andhra Pradesh State, India. It
is believed that this village which was not known to anyone for many years was found out later. It is therefore called Podagatlapalli (podagattu in vernacular means to find out; palli means village).

A small canal flows by the side of this village called Gorinkalakalva. A Maharshi once performed penance for a long time when his nails grew long and became curved. Vasishta who was requested by this sage that there should be a river in the latter's name readily granted the latter's desire. So the canal was called Goruvankaranadi and it gradually became Gorinkalakalva (goru in vernacular means a nail; vankara means curved and nadi means a river).

Culture
Many Vedic Scholars and Sanskrit pundits hailed from this village. Well-known Mimasa Scholar and president award winner Remella Suryaprakash Sastry hails from this village. The Pidaparti family is known for writing and printing an almanac (panchangam) every year.

The S.P.S.S.R. Oriental College (Estd.1969) was a Sanskrit college established in the village by kshatriyas. In olden days people from far used to come to this place to learn Sanskrit.

Viswanadha Foundation has set up Sri Sai Viswanadha Veda Vidya Peetham in Podagatlapalli on 1 November 2007.

On 12 January 2013, Jagadguru Shankaracharya Sri Sri Bharati Tirtha Mahaswamiji graced the village of Podagatlapalli and visited the Vishwanadha Veda Vidya Peetham and blessed the efforts to sustain Vedic education.

References

Villages in East Godavari district